The 1979 USC Trojans football team represented the University of Southern California (USC) in the 1979 NCAA Division I-A football season. In their fourth year under head coach John Robinson, the Trojans compiled an 11–0–1 record (6–0–1 against conference opponents), won the Pacific-10 Conference (Pac-10) championship, and outscored their opponents by a combined total of 389 to 171. The team was ranked #2 in both the final AP Poll and the final UPI Coaches Poll.

Quarterback Paul McDonald led the team in passing, completing 164 of 264 passes for 2,223 yards with 18 touchdowns and six interceptions.  Charles White led the team in rushing with 332 carries for 2,050 yards and 19 touchdowns. Dan Garcia led the team in receiving with 29 catches for 492 yards and three touchdowns.

The team was named national champion by the College Football Researchers Association, an NCAA-designated major selector.

Schedule

Season summary

at Texas Tech

at Oregon State
Paul McDonald completed eight of nine passes for 108 yards and two touchdowns in just one half of action while Charles White watched from the sidelines with an injured shoulder. McDonald led the Trojans to touchdowns on their first five possessions before he and the rest of USC starters sat for the second half.

Minnesota

at LSU

Washington State

Stanford
Charles White 32 rushes, 221 yards

at Notre Dame

at California

Arizona

at Washington

vs. UCLA

Rose Bowl (vs. Ohio State)
Charles White 39 rushes, 247 yards

Personnel

1979 Team Players in the NFL
Marcus Allen
Chip Banks
Hoby Brenner
Joey Browner
Brad Budde
Steve Busick
Ray Butler
Dennis Johnson
Myron Lapka
Ronnie Lott
Jeff Fisher
Chris Foote
Roy Foster
Bruce Matthews
Paul McDonald
Larry McGrew
Don Mosebar
Anthony Muñoz
Eric Scoggins
Dennis Smith
Keith Van Horne
Charles White

Awards and honors
Brad Budde, Lombardi Award
Charles White, Heisman Trophy
Charles White, Maxwell Award
Charles White, Walter Camp Award

References

USC
USC Trojans football seasons
Pac-12 Conference football champion seasons
Rose Bowl champion seasons
College football undefeated seasons
USC Trojans football